is Susumu Hirasawa's first solo album.

Background
In December 1988, Hirasawa decided to put his post-punk/new wave band P-Model on hiatus after spending two years being unable to arrange a recording deal, feeling that the group's continued existence was taking a mental and emotional toll on him. The following year, he was signed to Polydor, where he recorded Water in Time and Space.

Composition
Water in Time and Space is half a self-cover album: With the band being put on hold, P-Model's Monster album was not recorded. However, Hirasawa could not afford to discard three of its songs and salvaged them for the album instead. Two songs from lo-fi cassette only releases (Scuba and Charity Original Tape) were also rearranged for the album, with Hirasawa wanting a better form for the former and the latter being a guideline for the style of Water in Time and Space. To prepare for the songwriting of new material, Hirasawa re-recorded "Happening by the Windowsill" by his former progressive rock band Mandrake as an étude.

Water in Time and Space features a large variety of styles, such as march, orchestral, western and folk, influenced by Jungian, New Age and Andean themes. The album has no particular total concept, unlike most of Hirasawa's solo output. Free from the constraints of P-Model and the band's nervous energy, the album is comparatively light and brisk. Though created with heavy use of digital devices, it is one of Hirasawa's least electronic works, with prominent use of acoustic tones throughout. In the manner of P-Model's 1986 album One Pattern, Hirasawa also put emphasis on sampling, with such sounds as bird chirping and coin rolling being used as rhythmic backing.

Production
Water in Time and Space is built around the Korg M1 workstation synthesizer, whose expansive, organic-sounding palette completely replaces the digital tones from the Casio synths used by the P-Model in their later years. The M1's built-in sequencer and its large memory bank led to a shift in Hirasawa's production style; with the M1, he could record parts of songs that were not completed in studio at home, being more equipped to make music by himself and less dependent on labels. Still, some equipment from One Pattern and Monster was carried over, as well as the mechanical lo-fi sound of the former album, setting up the general production style of Hirasawa's first solo phase.

The chief engineer of the album is Yoshiaki Kondo, who worked on Karkador and One Pattern, this being the first project where Hirasawa got his long-sought services unaltered. Besides electronics, Hirasawa also performed with plucked string instruments and percussion instruments. Only two tracks were performed by Hirasawa completely solo, while others feature a variety of guest performers, such as session musicians for parts he could not play by himself and friends from the underground new wave scene. For songs that required choral backing, Hirasawa would get whoever was present during recording and form an impromptu choir.

Track listing

Personnel
 Susumu Hirasawa - vocals, classical guitar, electric guitar, bass, crumhorn (on "Haldyn Hotel"), timpani, percussion, synthesizers, drum machine, sampler, sequencer, Ozonotech Computer ("Say" program - Computer Voice on "Dune"), programming, arrangements, production

additional musicians
  - crumhorn (credited as "Krumme Horn") on "Haldyn Hotel"
 Akiro "Kamio" Arishima, Masahiro Furukawa & Hisayuki Makanae - backing vocals on "Haldyn Hotel"
  (also listed under special thanks as "Akimoto-kun") - backing vocals on "Haldyn Hotel" and "Coyote"
  Section - violins, cellos, violas and double basses on "Root of Spirit"
  - percussion on "Coyote", drums on "Frozen Beach" and "Venus"
 Kazumi "Keralino 'Kera' Sandorovich" Kobayashi - backing vocals and Coyote Voice on "Coyote"
 Jun Togawa (courtesy of Teichiku Records) - backing vocals on "No Workshop"
 Kayo "Kokubo" Matsumoto - acoustic piano on "Water in Time and Space"
 Tsuneo Imahori - bass on "Skeleton Coast Park"
  - min'yō styled vocal on "Skeleton Coast Park"

technical
 Yoshiaki Kondo (Gok Sound) - recording & mixing engineer
 Shinichi Tomita, Nobuhiko Matsufuji, Atsushi Hattori (Mix); Masanori Ihara (Gold Rush Studio); Yoshikatsu Takatori (Sound Inn) - second engineers

visuals
 Kiyoshi Inagaki - art director
 Mado & Vincent - photography
 Akemi Tsujitani, Michiko Aoki - styling
 Kazunori Yoshida - hair & makeup

operations
 Octave
 Mitsuo Nagano - artist management
 Megumi Watase - desk
 Mitsuru Hirose - publicity coordination
 Office Moving - concert coordination
 Polydor Records.
 Kazuyoshi Aoki - A&R
 Osamu Takeuchi - backing vocals on "Haldyn Hotel" and "Coyote" (credited as "Michäel Saturnus"), assistant

Thanks
Yasumasa Mishima, Yumiko Ohno, Masaya Abe, Mezame no Sato, Kei Fukuchi, Kazumi Sawaki, AC Unit, Ice Grey, Nobuyoshi Matsubara, Akira Ito, Aria, Casio, Signifie

Release history

 "Haldyn Hotel", "Root of Spirit", "Coyote", "Frozen Beach" and "Venus" are included on the ADVANCED ROCK 3 promotional sampler.
 "Solar Ray (SPECTRUM 2 TYPE)" is the B-Side to the "World Turbine" single.
 "Haldyn Hotel [Fractal Terrain Track]" is the B-Side to the "Bandiria Travellers [Physical Navigation Version]" single.
 "Venus" is included on Detonator Orgun 2; "Water in Time and Space (Full Size)" and "Root of Spirit" are on the Detonator Orgun 3 soundtrack album.
 "Haldyn Hotel [Fractal Terrain Track]", "Root of Spirit", "Skeleton Coast Park" and "Venus" are included on the Root of Spirit～ESSENCE OF HIRASAWA SOLO WORKS～ compilation.
 "Haldyn Hotel" (and "Fractal Terrain Track"), "Root of Spirit", "Solar Ray (SPECTRUM 2 TYPE)", "Frozen Beach", "Water in Time and Space (Full Size)" and "Venus" are included on the Archetype | 1989-1995 Polydor years of Hirasawa compilation.

References

Bibliography

 .

External links
 
 時空の水 at iTunes Japan
 時空の水 at amazon.co.jp
 時空の水 at Universal Music Japan's official site
 時空の水 at Tower Records Online

Susumu Hirasawa albums
Japanese-language albums
1989 debut albums
Polydor Records albums